Sherbin is a town in Egypt, located in the governorate of Dakahlia.

Etymology 
The word  means "cypress" in Classical Arabic.

History 
Sherbin is one of the old towns of Egypt it was mentioned in the Dengawi works, It was also in the works of Al-Gharbiyyah as "شربين" (Arabic for Sherbin). And in Ottoman times it was part of the walayah of Gharbia. At 1826, Sherbin (and the surrounding areas) became a markaz known as "بلاد الأرز شرقا" (lit. Western Rice Countries) It was changed in 1871 to "مركز بلاد الأرز شرقا" (lit. Markaz of the Western Rice Countries) until finally at 1875 it was changed to the current name which is "مركز شربين" meaning Markaz of Sherbin.

See also

 List of cities and towns in Egypt

References

Cities in Egypt
Populated places in Dakahlia Governorate